The Winnipeg Rugby Football Club was a Canadian football team in Winnipeg, Manitoba that played in the Manitoba Rugby Football Union between 1892 and 1906. The team was originally founded in 1879, was the first club in Manitoba, and played in the Manitoba Rugby League, the forerunner to the MRFU which was founded in 1892. They were 3 time league champions.

The team is not part of the official history or records of Winnipeg's current team: the Blue Bombers.

MRFU season-by-season

References
 
	 
Defunct Canadian football teams
Win
1879 establishments in Manitoba
1906 disestablishments in Manitoba
Sports clubs established in 1879
Sports clubs disestablished in 1906